Pinch Creek may refer to:

 Pinch Creek (Loutre River), a stream in Missouri
 Pinch Creek (Elk River), a stream in West Virginia